Umberto Ragazzi (born 27 July 1953) is an Italian rower. He competed in the men's double sculls event at the 1976 Summer Olympics.

He also placed fourth in the men's single sculls event at the 1975 World rowing championships in Nottingham.

References

1953 births
Living people
Italian male rowers
Olympic rowers of Italy
Rowers at the 1976 Summer Olympics
Place of birth missing (living people)
Sportspeople from the Metropolitan City of Venice
People from Murano